Sandison is a Scottish surname. Notable people with the surname include:

 Gordon Sandison (politician) (1919–1989), American politician
 Gordon Sandison (baritone) (1949–2018), Scottish operatic baritone
 Jimmy Sandison (born 1965), Scottish footballer
 Johnny Sandison (1926–2004), Canadian broadcaster
 Marcus (born 1971) and Michael (born 1970) Sandison, Scottish electronic music duo of Boards of Canada
 Ronald A. Sandison (1916–2010), Scottish psychotherapist
 Scott Sandison (born 1979), Canadian field hockey player

Scottish surnames
Patronymic surnames
Surnames from given names